Chan Hao-ching and Chan Yung-jan were the defending champions, but chose not to compete together. Hao-ching played alongside Christina McHale, but lost in the first round to Andrea Hlaváčková and Peng Shuai. Yung-jan teamed up with Martina Hingis, but lost in the semifinals to Olga Savchuk and Yaroslava Shvedova.

Abigail Spears and Katarina Srebotnik won the title, defeating Savchuk and Shvedova in the final, 6–3, 7–6(9–7).

Seeds

Draw

References
Main Draw

Qatar Total Open - Doubles
Qatar Ladies Open
2017 in Qatari sport